"Fire Under My Feet" is a song by British singer and songwriter Leona Lewis from her fifth studio album, I Am (2015). It was released as the lead single from the album on 7 June 2015, by Island and Def Jam. An uptempo song with gospel influenced, "Fire Under My Feet" was recorded at Kite Music Studios in Los Angeles, and was written by Lewis and American record producer Toby Gad, who also produced the song and performed at instrumentation and programming.

Background and release
During an interview with Lewis Corner for Digital Spy in November 2013, Lewis revealed that she had been "getting ideas together" for her next studio album during the summer of 2013, but had to postpone the recording of the album until January 2014, as she was focusing on the promotion of her holiday album, Christmas, with Love. Throughout early-mid 2014, Lewis commenced to part ways with Syco, the label to which she had previously been signed since winning the third series of British reality singing competition, The X Factor in 2006. The news was revealed on 3 June 2014, where it was also revealed that she had joined to Island Records. Lewis stated that the move was a "dream come true" and that she could not wait to "start making music" on the new label.

On 19 December 2014, a short clip of Lewis performing a new song was uploaded to her Facebook account with the caption "Getting ready for 2015..."; the video referred to the song as being called "Fire Under My Feet" A second clip was uploaded to Lewis' personal YouTube account on 12 February 2015 where the song was titled "Fire". Throughout early-mid 2015, more snippets of the track and its music video surfaced over the internet, revealing that the release date of the track's full music video to be 11 May 2015 and confirming the track's title to be "Fire Under My Feet". A day before the planned release of the track's music video, the official single cover for "Fire Under My Feet" was released on 10 May 2015.

The full song made its debut on BBC Radio 2 on 11 May 2015, with the music video for being uploaded to Lewis's YouTube account later that same day, several weeks before the single was released for digital download and streaming on 7 June 2015 in the UK. The track was confirmed available for download and stream "everywhere" (on iTunes, Google Play Music, Amazon Music and Spotify) by Def Jam Records on 9 June 2015.

Music and lyrics 
"Fire Under My Feet" is an uptempo song with elements of gospel, which was written by Lewis with Toby Gad. The songs lasts for a duration of three minutes and 34 seconds. Instrumentation consists of a piano and a "foot-tapping, clappy beat". For the chorus, Lewis employs a "diva-like" style of vocals as she sings the lyrics "I got fire under my feet, and I feel it in my heartbeat/ You can't put out these flames/ You can't keep me down in my seat." Upon its release, "Fire Under My Feet" generated numerous comparisons to that of Adele's 2011 single "Rolling in the Deep". A reviewer for MTV UK noted that the uptempo melody and the lyrics "woah, woah, woah" resemble elements the latters song.

Three remixes of "Fire Under My Feet" were uploaded to Lewis' Vevo account throughout May 2015 after the release of the track's music video on 11 May 2015: "Fire Under My Feet (Endor Remix)" was uploaded on 11 May 2015 (the same day as the official music video); "Fire Under My Feet (Steve Pitron & Max Sanna Remix)" was uploaded on 15 May 2015; while "Fire Under My Feet (Benny Benassi Remix)" was uploaded on 22 May 2015. Lewis Corner for Digital Spy described the Endor Remix of the track as a "dance anthem".

Live performances
Lewis performed the song live on numerous occasions throughout 2015, the first of which was an acoustic performance for BBC Scotland on 3 June 2015. The first televised performance of the track was on Sunday Night at the Palladium on 7 June 2015.

Other notable performances of the track were at G-A-Y Heaven on 13 June 2015, where Lewis also performed two new tracks from her upcoming album I Am: "I Got You" and "Another Love Song"; and on The One Show on 19 June 2015.

Music video
The official music video for "Fire Under My Feet" was released on 11 May 2015; the video was directed by Declan Whitebloom. Justin Harp for Digital Spy described the video as "inspiring".

On 17 May 2015, a behind the scenes video for "Fire Under My Feet" was uploaded to Lewis' Vevo account. It featured some of the cast who starred in the video talking about how they were able to overcome adversity, tying in with the song's theme of self-empowerment. In the video, Lewis described the song as about having "passion [...] even though there's adversity" and described it "incredible" that the cast were able to "overcome [many obstacles] to do what they are passionate about".

Critics reviews and commercial reception 
Jocelyn Vena of Billboard described the song as "anthemic" and continued to compliment Lewis' vocal performance and prowess.

For the week ending 30 May 2015, "Fire Under My Feet" debuted at number 34 on the U.S. Billboard Top Twitter Tracks. The following week it rose to number 12. It debuted at number 45 on the Hot Dance Club Songschart. It rose to 36 the following week. In the UK the single made its debut on the UK Singles Chart at number 51 becoming Leona's second single to miss the top 40, the single did however reach number 26 on the sales only version of the chart. "Fire Under My Feet" also charted at number 26 on the UK Download Chart. It also entered the Scottish Single Chart at number 23.

The Guardians Michael Cragg wrote a piece for the paper titled "From X Factor to off the charts: why Leona Lewis can't crack the top 40", in article Cragg analysed the why the single "failed to burn up the music charts" in his words. He noted that the British media leaked early details about the release including the song's themes and ultimately suggested that the song was "allegedly a stinging attack on Cowell and how free she is from the shackles of Syco". Cragg also criticised the song itself saying that the song "strong enough to make its mark in today's overcrowded pop market" and concluded that it was "also hard to shake the fact that it sounded better when Adele did it as "Rolling in the Deep" (2010) a few years ago."

Track listings 

Digital single
 "Fire Under My Feet" – 3:34

Digital Remix Single
"Fire Under My Feet" (Dzeko & Torres Remix) – 4:07

Digital album track
<li>"Fire Under My Feet" (United Studios Session) – 3:43

Digital Remixes EP
"Fire Under My Feet" (Benny Benassi Remix) – 5:17
"Fire Under My Feet" (Endor Remix) – 3:33
"Fire Under My Feet" (Steve Pitron & Max Sanna Remix) – 3:43

Personnel
Credits sourced from album booklet and liner.

Leona Lewis – vocals, composer
Toby Gad – instruments, programming, mixing, composer

Charts

Weekly charts

Year-end charts

Radio and release history

References

2015 singles
2014 songs
Leona Lewis songs
Island Records singles
Songs written by Toby Gad
Songs written by Leona Lewis